Must Be the Music is a British television musical talent competition.

It may also refer to:
Must Be the Music (film), a 1996 short film by Nickolas Perry
Must Be the Music (Polish TV series), a Polish television musical talent competition
Must Be the Music, a 2011 album by Joi Cardwell
"Must Be the Music", a 1999 song by Joey Negro
"Must Be the Music", a 2008 song by Mýa from Sugar & Spice
"Must Be the Music", a 1982 song by Secret Weapon